Wu Shishu (born May 27, 1923) is a Chinese theoretical physicist and professor at Jilin University. In 1980, he was elected a member of the Chinese Academy of Science.

Wu is one of the physicists who established the Department of Physics at Jilin University. He was the second dean of the department and succeeded Professor Yu Ruihuang.

Early life and education
Wu was born in Beijing on May 27, 1923. He obtained a bachelor's degree in 1944 from Tongji University and a doctorate degree in 1951 from the University of Illinois.

References

1923 births
20th-century Chinese physicists
Members of the Chinese Academy of Sciences
People from Beijing
Living people
Theoretical physicists
Academic staff of Jilin University
Tongji University alumni
University of Illinois alumni